Zilla Parishad Jalgaon or District Council Jalgaon is a district council having jurisdiction over Jalgaon district in Maharashtra, India.

History
Zilla Parishad Jalgaon was established in 1962.

Zilla Parishad Constituencies
Zilla Parishad Jalgaon has 67 district council constituencies in the Jalgaon district.

Zilla Parishad Elections 2017
The election results of all the 25 Zilla Parishads and 118 Panchayat Samitis were declared on 23 February 2017. Jalgaon ZP Election result is as follows:

Panchayat Samiti
There are fifteen Panchayat Samitis under jurisdiction of Zilla Parishad Jalgaon.

1) Panchayat Samiti Jalgaon
2) Panchayat Samiti Chalisgaon
3) Panchayat Samiti Bhadgaon
4) Panchayat Samiti Parola
5) Panchayat Samiti Amalner
6) Panchayat Samiti Chopada
7) Panchayat Samiti Erandol
8) Panchayat Samiti Pachora
9) Panchayat Samiti Jamner
10) Panchayat Samiti Bhusaval
11) Panchayat Samiti Yaval
12) Panchayat Samiti Raver
13) Panchayat Samiti Muktainagar
14) Panchayat Samiti Bodwad
15) Panchayat Samiti Dharangaon

References

Jalgaon district
Local government in Maharashtra